Gerald Thomas Smith (July 19, 1943 – October 15, 1986) was a professional American football tight end for the National Football League's Washington Redskins for 13 seasons, from 1965 through 1977. By the time he retired, he held the NFL record for most career touchdowns by a tight end. Smith publicly announced he had AIDS in August 1986, being the first professional athlete to do so. He died two months later. A 2014 documentary from the NFL Network's A Football Life series profiles his career, as well as his "double life as a closeted gay man and a star athlete."

Professional career

Smith attended Arizona State, where he did not play football until his junior season.  Joining the team as a walk-on wide receiver in 1964, Smith caught 9 passes for 129 yards and 2 touchdowns in 9 games.  The following season, Smith was converted to tight end, and went on to catch 42 passes for 618 yards and 5 touchdowns.

Selected in the ninth round (118th overall) of the 1965 NFL Draft, - where his team mates included Charley Taylor, and his college friends included David Mixner - Smith was also drafted by the Kansas City Chiefs in the 18th round of the 1965 AFL Draft.

Smith developed his Redskins career as a running and catching tight end under head coaches Bill McPeak, Otto Graham and most memorably under Vince Lombardi, who had a positive approach to gay players. After Lombardi's death, under George Allen his role changed to mainly blocking, leading the team to Super Bowl VII at the end of the 1972 season. In the fourth quarter with the Redskins trailing the Miami Dolphins, quarterback Billy Kilmer tried a pass to Smith who was running across the end zone, but the ball hit the goal post. Although the Redskins lost the game 14-7, Sports Illustrated called Smith "an outstanding receiver among tight ends, with the ability to break open for a long gain."

In 1976 the Redskins signed the larger and faster Jean Fugett, who Smith helped and assisted in his integration to the team. In the same year, he was quietly approached by Washington Star journalist Lynn Rosellini with regards her series of gay sports people. Smith contributed on the understanding that neither his name, team or position were revealed. Rosellini opened her article with a description of Smith's hands, which led former team mate Dave Kopay to recognize the player as Smith, and hence lead to Kopay telephoning Rosellini and becoming the first former football player to come out two days later.

Despite his skills having diminished, coach Allen kept bringing Smith back into the Redskins roster due to his work ethic. Smith made one catch in 1977, and spent the 1978 season on the injured list. Smith caught 421 passes, including 60 touchdowns, a career record for tight ends at the time and the 17th highest total in NFL history. His record held for 27 years, beaten by Shannon Sharpe on November 16, 2003.  His 421 receptions were the third highest total ever by a tight end when he retired, trailing only Hall of Famers Mike Ditka and Jackie Smith. Smith was named All-Pro twice and held several NFL records that stood for years. In 2011, the Professional Football Researchers Association named Smith to the PRFA Hall of Very Good Class of 2011.

In , as a part of a USO tour in association with the NFL, Smith, along with other stars John Brown, Butch Byrd, Fred Hoaglin, George Kunz, and Tom Woodeshick, visited and signed autographs for wounded military personnel in Vietnam.

From 1967 to 1970, Smith was a full time starter for the Redskins. He missed several games in 1971 to injury, but was back as a full time starter the following season, and would be until his final season in 1977. During his career, Smith made several All-Pro teams.

Coming out
After officially retiring at the end of the 1978 season, Smith quietly came out as gay to a few family members. This allowed him to explain why he moved to Austin, Texas, where he co-owned the gay bar "The Boathouse" – a decision he later regretted.

Smith moved back to the support of his family in Silver Spring, Maryland in 1986, where looking thinner and coughing, he was diagnosed at the Holy Cross Hospital with HIV. After discussing the matter with his family and friends, he contacted Washington Post journalist George Solomon – the ground rule being that they did not discuss how he got the disease – with the resultant front page article published on August 7, 1986. He was subsequently visited and supported by all of his former teammates and coaches.

Death
Smith died of AIDS at age 43 on October 15, 1986, at Holy Cross Hospital in Silver Spring, Maryland. He was the first former professional athlete to die of the disease.  Although he acknowledged that he had AIDS, he never publicly acknowledged he was gay. At a funeral attended by all of his former team mates and coaches - some of whom also acted as coffin bearers - Smith was buried at Gate of Heaven Cemetery in Silver Spring.

Head coach Vince Lombardi, who had a gay brother, demanded a homophobia free locker room but "not even the legendary Lombardi could insulate him from the crippling societal homophobia of the era." Shortly before he died, Smith said: "Every important thing a man searches for in his life, I found in Coach Lombardi. He made us men."

Smith's sexuality was confirmed after his death by former teammate pro NFL football player David Kopay, who had come out years earlier. Kopay referred to a sexual encounter with Smith, using an alias for him, in his autobiography. After the book's publication, Smith never spoke to Kopay again. The Redskins logo, along with Smith's uniform number 87, was part of the AIDS quilt.

After a period of time post his death, some of Smith's teammates said they knew he was gay. Brig Owens, a safety for the Redskins at the time who also roomed with Smith, said Smith lived in fear, because if people knew he was gay, he would be done in football. He said Smith was afraid that people would take away something that he loved. Owens was one of the players on the team that knew for sure Smith was gay. Dave Kopay was briefly a teammate of Smith's. Kopay came out in 1972, after his playing career ended. He also wrote an autobiography about having a relationship with a teammate. Even though Kopay used an alias, Smith knew Kopay was talking about him. After the autobiography came out, Smith never spoke to Kopay again. Of all of his teammates, Smith was closer to Owens than perhaps anyone else. Their bond was so tight, Owens' own daughters referred to Smith as 'Uncle Jerry'. Redskins center Len Hauss was another close friend to Smith as well. On one occasion, a player said a word Hauss did not like (most likely a gay slur) and Hauss confronted the player and said he'd better not hear that word in the locker room again - and it never was again.

In 2014, the NFL network aired A Football Life: Jerry Smith. The hour long show was about Smith, his career, and his death from AIDS. Brig Owens was interviewed during commercial breaks. When asked if Smith belongs in the Hall of Fame, Owens replied that Smith would be in the hall already if he was not gay.

See also
Homosexuality in American football

References

Sources

External links

1943 births
1986 deaths
AIDS-related deaths in Maryland
American football tight ends
Arizona State Sun Devils football players
Eastern Conference Pro Bowl players
Gay sportsmen
LGBT Christians
LGBT people from Oregon
LGBT players of American football
Players of American football from Oregon
Sportspeople from Eugene, Oregon
Washington Redskins players
20th-century American LGBT people
American LGBT sportspeople
Bisexual sportspeople